Ipecac Neat is the first studio album by American rapper P.O.S. It was released on Doomtree Records in 2004. It was re-released on Rhymesayers Entertainment in 2005.

Production
P.O.S began his hip hop career as half of a rap duo called Cenospecies. After the duo broke up, they were still booked to play at several more shows. Because P.O.S was contractually obligated to perform at these shows, he had to write songs that he could perform solo. He told City Pages in 2014 that Ipecac Neat consisted of "pretty much every solo song" that he had written up to that point. Half of the album was recorded in P.O.S's own basement and the other half in a neighbor's living room, as opposed to a recording studio.

Critical reception

Marisa Brown of AllMusic gave the album 4 out of 5 stars, describing it as "an energetic, angry, intense record with dark, engaging Aesop Rock-like beats that incorporate guitar and strings loops, purposeful drums, and ominous scratches." She added, "The melodies and harmonies switch from song to song, but there's a consistency in the production, so much so that it, along with the heaviness and anger, begins to sound a bit repetitive and even weighs down the album."

Track listing

Personnel
Credits adapted from liner notes.

 P.O.S – vocals, production (3–5, 7–14, 16), recording, engineering
 MK Larada – production (1, 6)
 Lazerbeak – production (2, 10, 15), vocals (10)
 Sims – vocals (2, 12)
 Crescent Moon – vocals (3, 14)
 Sean McPherson – bass guitar (4, 10)
 Toki Wright – vocals (8)
 Cecil Otter – vocals (11)
 I Self Devine – vocals (16)
 Turbo Nemesis – turntables
 Joe Mabbott – mixing
 Christopher Blood – mastering

References

External links
 
 Ipecac Neat at Bandcamp

2004 debut albums
P.O.S albums
Rhymesayers Entertainment albums
Doomtree Records albums
Albums produced by Lazerbeak